Havells India Limited is an Indian multinational electrical equipment company, based in Noida. It was founded by Haveli Ram Gandhi, later sold to Qimat Rai Gupta who was his distributor. The company manufactures home appliances, lighting for domestic, commercial and industrial applications, LED lighting, fans, modular switches and wiring accessories, water heaters, industrial and domestic circuit protection switchgear, industrial and domestic cables and wires, induction motors, and capacitors among others. Havells owns brands like Havells, Lloyd, Crabtree, Standard Electric, Reo and Promptec.

The company has 23 branches or representative offices with over 6,000 workers in over 50 countries. India's first Lloyd's exclusive outlet is acquired by businessman Rajan Bansal. The store is situated in western part of New Delhi, Paschim Vihar. As of 2016, it has 11 manufacturing plants in India located at Haridwar, Baddi, Noida, Faridabad, Alwar, Neemrana, and Bengaluru.

History
In 1983, it bought the loss-making Delhi-based Towers and Transformers Ltd and turned it around in a year. Between 1997 and 2001, Havells also bought ECS, Duke Arnics Electronics, Standard Electricals and Crabtree India. There was a 50:50 joint venture between Havells and the UK-based Crabtree, and Havells later acquired Crabtree's stake in the JV. In 2007, Havells acquired European lighting company Sylvania for about €200 million. In 2010, Havells introduced ceramic metal-halide lamp.

In April 2015, Havells acquired a 51% majority stake in Promptec Renewable before increasing its stake in the company to 100% in 2018.

Social initiatives

Havells provides mid-day meals for school children in Alwar district, covering 50,000 students per day.

Recognition
In 2014, Havells was listed 125th among 1200 of India's most trusted brands according to the Brand Trust Report 2014, a study conducted by Trust Research Advisory.

References

External links

Electrical wiring and construction supplies manufacturers
Electrical equipment manufacturers
Manufacturing companies based in Noida
Electronics companies established in 1958
Electrical engineering companies of India
1958 establishments in Uttar Pradesh
Wire and cable manufacturers
Indian brands
Companies listed on the National Stock Exchange of India
Companies listed on the Bombay Stock Exchange
Home appliance manufacturers of India